Alexander M. "Sandy" Talbot (30 July 1949 – 25 December 2018) was an Australian rules footballer who played with Essendon in the Victorian Football League (VFL). He later played for Preston in the Victorian Football Association (VFA), was captain-coach of Daylesford, and finished his career with his old side, Bacchus Marsh.

Notes

External links 

Essendon Football Club past player profile

1949 births
Australian rules footballers from Victoria (Australia)		
Essendon Football Club players
Preston Football Club (VFA) players
Daylesford Football Club players
East Ballarat Football Club players
2018 deaths